Tolley may refer to:

People
 Banks Tolley (born 2000), American Double Division I athlete
 Anne Tolley (born 1953), New Zealand politician
 Chris Tolley (born 1967), British cricketer
 Dave Tolley (born 1978), Canadian percussionist
 Harold S. Tolley (1894–1956), American politician
 Jamie Tolley (born 1983), Welsh soccer player
 Jen Tolley (born 1961), American-Canadian voice actress
 Kemp Tolley (1908–2000), American naval officer
 Louis Tolley (1889–1959), British politician
 Rick Tolley (1940–1970), American football coach

Other uses
 Mount Tolley, Antarctica
 Tolley, North Dakota, US
 Tolley & Company Warehouse, a heritage building in Fremantle, West Australia
 Tolley Creek, Vernon County, Missouri, UL
 Tolley family, South Australia winemakers
 Tolley (company), a publishing company in the UK

See also
Tolleys, West Virginia